In graph theory, the shift graph  for  is the graph whose vertices correspond to the ordered -tuples  with  and where two vertices  are adjacent if and only if  or  for all . It is natural to enhance the shift graph  with the orientation  if  for all . Let  be the resulting directed shift graph.
Note that  is the directed line graph of the transitive tournament corresponding to the identity permutation.

Further facts about shift graphs
Odd cycles of  have length at least , in particular  is triangle free.
Further connections to the chromatic theory of graphs and digraphs have been established in.
Shift graphs, in particular  also play a central role in the context of order dimension of interval orders.

Representation of shift graphs

Two such segments are connected if the starting point of one line segment is the end point of the other.

References

Graph coloring